Arnold Adams is a former Bermudian cricketer.  Adams' batting style is unknown.

Adams made two List A appearances for Bermuda against Guyana and Windward Islands in the 1999/00 Red Stripe Bowl. Against Guyana, he was dismissed for a duck by Keith Semple, while against the Windward Islands he had the same result, this time being dismissed by McNeil Morgan.

References

External links
Arnold Adams at ESPNcricinfo
Arnold Adams at CricketArchive

Living people
Bermudian cricketers
Year of birth missing (living people)